"Don't Stop the Music" is a song by Yarbrough and Peoples, from the duo's 1980 debut album, The Two of Us. It was released as a single on Mercury Records in 1980.

Chart performance
The song reached number 26 on the dance charts, number 19 on the Billboard Hot 100, and fared even better on the US R&B chart, where it hit number one, Outside the US, "Don't Stop the Music" went to number 7 in the UK. The song's success helped to earn a gold record for the duo.
Radio promotion for the record was handled in Los Angeles by independent marketing firm Dudley-Gorov, while a young Russell Simmons shopped the record to New York club DJs as one of his early jobs.

Chart history

Music video
The music video for the song featured hand puppets singing "You don't really wanna stop? No!" The duo also used them for many of their live performances.

Samples and covers
"Don't Stop the Music" has been heavily sampled by other artists, primarily in the hip hop genre, on songs including "Gangsta Lovin'" by Eve, "All Night Long" by Common, "Let It Go" by Keyshia Cole, and "Crazy in Love" (Rockwilder Remix) by Beyoncé.

References

1981 singles
1980 songs
Mercury Records singles